Ozerki is a rural locality (a village) and the administrative centre of Ozerkinsky Selsoviet, Karaidelsky District, Bashkortostan, Russia. The population was 501 as of 2010. There are 3 streets.

Geography 
Ozerki is located 68 km northeast of Karaidel (the district's administrative centre) by road. Krush is the nearest rural locality.

References 

Rural localities in Karaidelsky District